The Lion may refer to:

Art, entertainment, and media

Fiction
 The Lion (Kessel novel), a 1958 novel by Joseph Kessel
 The Lion (film), a 1962 film, adapted from the novel
 "The Lion", first episode of the 1965 Doctor Who serial The Crusade
 The Lion (DeMille novel), a 2010 novel by Nelson DeMille

Music
 The Lion (album), an album by Youssou N'Dour
 The Lion (EP), an EP by Wild Adriatic

Other uses
 The Lion (locomotive), a historic steam locomotive at the Maine State Museum in Augusta, Maine
 The Lion (mountain), a mountain in South West Tasmania
 "The Lion", nickname of a character in the TV series Narcos
 The Lion, Potters Bar, a pub in Potters Bar, Hertfordshire, England
 WKPS, branded as "The LION 90.7fm"
The Lion, a nickname for Theodore Roosevelt, the 26th president of United States

See also
 Lion (disambiguation)
 Lion, one of the five big cats in the genus Panthera